The Clockwork Angels Tour was a concert tour in support of the 2012 album, Clockwork Angels, by the Canadian rock band Rush. The tour included shows in Canada, the United States and throughout Europe. A nine-piece string ensemble accompanied the band during the second set of each performance, which highlighted songs from Clockwork Angels.

Setlist
Standard Setlist:

Set One
 "Subdivisions"
 "The Big Money"
 "Force Ten"
 "Grand Designs"
 "The Body Electric" or "Middletown Dreams" or "Limelight"
 "Territories"
 "The Analog Kid"
 "Bravado" or "The Pass"
 "Where's My Thing? (Part IV, "Gangster of Boats" Trilogy)"
 "Far Cry"
Set Two
 "Caravan"
 "Clockwork Angels"
 "The Anarchist"
 "Carnies"
 "The Wreckers"
 "Headlong Flight"
 "Halo Effect"
 "Seven Cities of Gold" or "Wish Them Well"
 "The Garden"
 "Manhattan Project" or "Dreamline"
 "Red Sector A"
 "YYZ"
 "The Spirit of Radio"
Encore
 "Tom Sawyer"
 "2112: Overture/The Temples of Syrinx/Grand Finale" or "Working Man"

Leg One

Leg Two

Tour dates

Festivals and other miscellaneous performances

Success
Top 200 North American Tours 2012: Rush, #33
Total Gross: US $27.2 million
Total Attendance: 340,766
No. of concerts: 35
Top 100 North American Mid Year Tours 2013: Rush, #69
Total Gross: US $4.4 million
Total Attendance: 55,117
No. of concerts: 14
Top 100 Worldwide Mid Year Tours 2013: Rush, #69
Total Gross: US $11.3 million
Total Attendance: 127,280
No. of concerts: 23
Top 100 Worldwide Tours 2013: Rush, #82
Total Gross: US $21.2 million
Total Attendance: 268,252
No. of concerts: 34

In summary
Total Gross: US $48.4 million
Total Attendance: 609,018
No. of concerts: 69

References

Bibliography
 Daly and Hansen. Rush: Wandering the Face of the Earth: The Official Touring History. Insight Editions, 2019. 

Rush (band) concert tours
2012 concert tours
2013 concert tours